K. Kunhiraman (born 28 February 1948) is an Indian politician from Kasaragod, Kerala. He is the ex MLA (Member of Legislative Assembly) representing Udma constituency. Additionally, he is a District Committee member of Communist Party of India (Marxist) (CPI(M)).

Family and early life
K. Kunhiraman was born and raised in Alakkode near Pallikkere in Kasaragod district of the state of Kerala, India in a middle-class family. His father Chandu Maniyani was a farmer and his mother Kunhamma was a housewife.

References

1948 births
Living people
Communist Party of India (Marxist) politicians from Kerala
People from Kasaragod district
Kerala MLAs 2016–2021